The 2004 United States presidential election in Kansas took place on November 2, 2004 as part of the 2004 United States presidential election. Voters chose six representatives, or electors to the Electoral College, who voted for president and vice president.

Kansas was won by incumbent President George W. Bush by a 25.4% margin of victory. Prior to the election, all 12 news organizations considered this a state Bush would win, or otherwise considered as a safe red state. On election day, it trended Republican from the 2000 election by a swing margin of almost 5%. He won every single congressional district and county, excluding two: Wyandotte County and Douglas County.

Caucuses
 2004 Kansas Democratic presidential caucuses

Campaign

Predictions
There were 12 news organizations who made state-by-state predictions of the election. Here are their last predictions before election day.

 D.C. Political Report: Solid Republican
 Associated Press: Solid Bush
 CNN: Bush
Cook Political Report: Solid Republican
 Newsweek: Solid Bush
New York Times: Solid Bush
 Rasmussen Reports: Bush
 Research 2000: Solid Bush
Washington Post: Bush
Washington Times: Solid Bush
Zogby International: Bush
 Washington Dispatch: Bush

Polling
Bush won every single pre-election poll, and won each by a double-digit margin of victory and with at least 56% of the vote. The final 3 polls averaged Bush leading 58% to 37% for Kerry and 3% for Nader.

Fundraising
Bush raised $980,035. Kerry raised $387,484.

Advertising and visits
Neither presidential candidate advertised or visited this state.  However, John Edwards visited the city of Lawrence in Douglas County briefly.

Analysis
Apart from its flirtation with William Jennings Bryan and Woodrow Wilson, Kansas has always been a Republican stronghold at the presidential level, voting for GOP nominees in all but seven elections since statehood. The last Democratic presidential nominee to carry the Sunflower State was Lyndon B. Johnson in his landslide in 1964. A combination of rural counties embedded with deep pockets of evangelical Christianity/social conservatism and moderate, fiscally conservative residents in Johnson County, Kansas nearly always votes Republican.

Results

By county

By congressional district
Bush won all four congressional districts, including one held by a Democrat.

Electors

Technically the voters of Kansas cast their ballots for electors: representatives to the Electoral College. Kansas is allocated 6 electors because it has 4 congressional districts and 2 senators. All candidates who appear on the ballot or qualify to receive write-in votes must submit a list of 6 electors, who pledge to vote for their candidate and his or her running mate. Whoever wins the majority of votes in the state is awarded all 6 electoral votes. Their chosen electors then vote for president and vice president. Although electors are pledged to their candidate and running mate, they are not obligated to vote for them. An elector who votes for someone other than his or her candidate is known as a faithless elector.

The electors of each state and the District of Columbia met on December 13, 2004, to cast their votes for president and vice president. The Electoral College itself never meets as one body. Instead the electors from each state and the District of Columbia met in their respective capitols.

The following were the members of the Electoral College from the state. All 6 were pledged to Bush/Cheney.
 Ruth Garvey Fink
 Bud Hentzen
 Dennis Jones
 Wanda Konold
 Jack Ranson
 Patricia Pitney Smith

See also
 United States presidential elections in Kansas
 Presidency of George W. Bush

References

Kansas
2004
2004 Kansas elections